Buehner is a surname. Notable people with the surname include:

Carl W. Buehner (1898–1974), German-born American LDS general authority
Mark Buehner (born 1959), American illustrator

See also
Buchner
Philip Buehner House